Eupithecia vaticina is a moth in the family Geometridae which is endemic to Dagestan.

References

External links

Moths described in 1982
Endemic fauna of Russia
vaticina
Moths of Europe